James Everett (1890–1967) was an Irish politician.

James, Jimmy, or Jim Everett may also refer to:

James Everett (writer) (1784–1872), English Methodist and miscellaneous writer
Jim Everett (Australian footballer) (1884–1968), Australian rules footballer
Jimmy Everett (1908–1996), American baseball player
Jim Everett (born 1963), American football quarterback
James Everett (Green party), Candidate in the 2013 election for the mayor of Minneapolis

See also